Elena de Toro Aldaria (born 31 January 1997) is a Spanish professional footballer who plays as a goalkeeper for Liga F club Villarreal CF.

Club career
De Toro started her career at La Solana B.

References

External links
Profile at La Liga

1997 births
Living people
Women's association football goalkeepers
Spanish women's footballers
Sportspeople from the Province of Ciudad Real
Footballers from Castilla–La Mancha
Fundación Albacete players
Villarreal CF (women) players
Primera División (women) players
Segunda Federación (women) players